Whabi Mohammad (born 1983) was reported to be the "fifth bomber" wanted in connection with the 21 July 2005 London bombings, and to have been arrested on or before 28 July 2005.

See also
 Ramzi Mohammed

References

British Muslims
July 2005 London bombings
Living people
1983 births
Place of birth missing (living people)
Date of birth missing (living people)